The International Challenge Cup (formerly the Ennia Challenge Cup and the Aegon Cup) is an annual figure skating competition generally held during the last week in February, up till the 2021 edition held in The Hague, Netherlands. Since the 2022 edition a three year contract has been signed with the city of Tilburg to host the event from the IJssportcentrum Tilburg with practice being organised on the neighbouring Ireen Wüst Ice Rink.

Medals may be awarded in men's singles, women' singles, pair skating, and ice dancing on the senior, junior, novice, and pre-novice levels, such as "Debs". Some categories may be omitted in some years due to a lack of participants.

History
In the 1970s and 1980s, the competition was titled the Ennia Challenge Cup and held in November. It did not include compulsory figures. The event later become known as the Aegon Challenge Cup after its title sponsor, Aegon N.V.

By the 21st century, the competition had moved to February or March. The 2016 edition was cancelled. In 2022 the Challenge Cup was hosted in the city of Tilburg leaving The Hague after years of being home to the Challenge Cup.

Since 2017, the Dutch Figure Skating Championships have been combined with the Challenge Cup.

Senior medalists

Men

Ladies

Pairs

Ice dancing

Junior medalists

Men

Women

Pairs

Ice dancing

Advanced novice medalists

Boys

Girls

Pairs

References

External links
 Schaatsen.nl 
 Official videos

 
Figure skating competitions
International figure skating competitions hosted by the Netherlands